Stijn Spierings (born 12 March 1996) is a Dutch professional footballer who plays as an attacking midfielder for  club Toulouse.

Club career
Born in Alkmaar, Spierings began his youth career and professional career with his local team AZ. Having broken into the first team he played on just two occasions in his first season, against PSV and Excelsior. He was then loaned to Sparta Rotterdam and played a role in their successful campaign to get promoted from the Eerste Divisie. At the end of that season Spierings signed a permanent deal with the club and has played in the youth team.

On 7 January 2019, he signed a one-and-a-half-year contract with RKC Waalwijk.

One year later, on 13 January 2020, Spierings moved abroad, signing a three-year deal with Bulgarian First League side Levski Sofia.

On 5 October 2020, Spierings signed a three-year contract with Ligue 2 club Toulouse. He thereby became the third Dutch player to wear the club's colours, after Rob Rensenbrink and Branco van den Boomen. Spierings was in head coach Patrice Garande's starting lineup in his first match on 17 October against Ajaccio, in which he scored the later winner on a penalty-kick, securing the 1–0 victory. He scored five goals in his first eight games.

International career
Stijn Spierings has also turned out appearances with the Dutch national team at youth level as well. He has played for the U17s and the U19 squad.

Career statistics

Honours
Sparta Rotterdam
 Eerste Divisie: 2015–16

Toulouse
 Ligue 2: 2021–22

References

External links
 
 
 

Living people
1996 births
Sportspeople from Alkmaar
Dutch footballers
Footballers from North Holland
Association football midfielders
Netherlands youth international footballers
Eredivisie players
Eerste Divisie players
First Professional Football League (Bulgaria) players
Ligue 1 players
Ligue 2 players
AZ Alkmaar players
Sparta Rotterdam players
RKC Waalwijk players
PFC Levski Sofia players
Toulouse FC players
Dutch expatriate footballers
Dutch expatriate sportspeople in Bulgaria
Expatriate footballers in Bulgaria
Dutch expatriate sportspeople in France
Expatriate footballers in France